This is a list of assassinations, sorted by location.

For the purposes of this article, an assassination is defined as the deliberate, premeditated murder of a prominent figure, often for religious, political or monetary reasons.

Africa

The Americas

Antigua and Barbuda

Argentina

Bermuda

Bolivia

Brazil

Canada

Chile

Colombia

Cuba

Curaçao

Dominican Republic

Ecuador

El Salvador

Grenada

Guatemala

Guyana

Haiti

Honduras

Mexico

Nicaragua

Panama

Paraguay

Peru

Suriname

United States

Uruguay

Venezuela

Asia

Europe

Oceania

Australia

New Caledonia

Samoa

Palau

Solomon Islands

West Papua

See also

 List of assassinated anticolonialist leaders
 List of assassinations by car bombing
 List of assassinated and executed heads of state and government
 List of assassinated serving ambassadors
 List of Israeli assassinations
 List of Iranian assassinations
 List of heads of state and government who survived assassination attempts
 List of people who survived assassination attempts
 List of terrorist incidents
 List of fictional assassins
 List of assassinations by the Assassins

References

Assassinations